Alfonso Laso Sedeño (died 1607) was a Roman Catholic prelate who served as Archbishop (Personal Title) of Mallorca (1604–1607), Archbishop of Cagliari (1596–1604), and Bishop of Gaeta (1587–1596).

Biography
On 12 October 1587, Alfonso Laso Sedeño was appointed during the papacy of Pope Sixtus V as Bishop of Gaeta.
On 7 February 1588, he was consecrated bishop by Enrico Caetani, Cardinal-Priest of Santa Pudenziana, with José Esteve Juan, Bishop of Vieste, and Cristóbal Senmanat y Robuster, Bishop of Orihuela, serving as co-consecrators.
On 7 February 1596, he was appointed during the papacy of Pope Clement VIII as Archbishop of Cagliari.
On 1 December 1604, he was appointed during the papacy of Pope Clement VIII as Archbishop (Personal Title) of Mallorca.
He served as Archbishop of Mallorca until his death on 21 August 1607.

Episcopal succession
While bishop, he was the principal consecrator of:
Francisco Esquivel, Archbishop of Cagliari (1605); 
and the principal co-consecrator of:
Carlos Muñoz Serrano, Bishop of Barbastro (1596).

References

External links and additional sources
 (for Chronology of Bishops) 
 (for Chronology of Bishops) 
 (for Chronology of Bishops) 
 (for Chronology of Bishops) 
 (for Chronology of Bishops) 
 (for Chronology of Bishops) 

16th-century Italian Roman Catholic bishops
17th-century Italian Roman Catholic bishops
Bishops appointed by Pope Sixtus V
Bishops appointed by Pope Clement VIII
1607 deaths